Float is a 2019 American computer-animated short film directed and written by Bobby Rubio, produced by Pixar Animation Studios, and distributed by Walt Disney Studios Motion Pictures. It is the fourth film in Pixar's SparkShorts program, and focuses on a son's ability to fly and the choice his father must make. The short was released on Disney+ on November 12, 2019.

Plot
A father is playing with his newborn son Alex in his front yard. While showing him a dandelion, Alex proceeds to float, surprising him. Watchful eyes begin to concern him as he grabs Alex and brings him back inside the house. Now four years old, Alex continues floating all over the darkened house as his father has become a hermit with a disheveled appearance. He keeps Alex on a leash and stuffs his backpack with rocks to keep him down, although these precautions are ineffective. They leave the house while trying to avoid the neighbors.

Much to his father's horror, Alex has escaped and is interacting with the other, confused children by floating. He hurriedly grabs Alex to leave the park, but Alex has a temper tantrum. He reacts in frustration by deeming Alex abnormal. Alex grounds himself and sadly pulls his hood over his head. As he looks at all the park attendees, his father, having answered his own question, cradles Alex in his arms and sits on the swing set, swinging back and forth to reinvigorate his son, and launches him in the air. Alex continues to fly as his father happily runs around underneath him.

Cast

 Eli Fucile as baby Alex
 Luna Watson as four-year-old Alex
 Bobby Rubio as Alex's father
 Mika Kubo as additional voices

Production 
Float is a short film that was directed and written by Bobby Rubio, and produced by Krissy Cababa and Pixar Animation Studios; it was distributed by Walt Disney Studios Motion Pictures. It is the fourth film of Pixar's "SparkShorts" program, and it lasts approximately seven minutes. In January 2019, Rubio described the program as "different films from the kinds of films" developed at Pixar, while executive producer Lindsey Collins said that the shorts are referred to as "SparkShorts" because Pixar "[wants] to discover that creative spark" in its employees. Rubio viewed the program as "a wonderful opportunity to tell [his] story". He stated that Float is inspired by his son, who is autistic, and that he identified with the father from the short. Rubio said that the boy from the short is "different from other children" since he can float. He commented that while "the father loves his son wholeheartedly without restriction" at first, this begins to be altered by what the other people say; as a result, he has to choose between deciding they are right and ignoring their thoughts.

Since his son was growing up, Rubio decided he had "to tell this story" and "started storyboarding it". The initial storyboards contained Caucasian characters, but one of Rubio's co-workers told him that he should depict Filipino-American characters instead. While he was initially unsure of this idea, he decided to make this change to "empower [his son] and empower children of color". Rubio wanted to incorporate some of his own features as a Filipino-American into the characters' designs in order to make them look "authentic". He commented that he was very "proud" that Float was released during Filipino American History Month. Rubio said that seeing the viewers react to some scenes in the way he had expected them to was "amazing", stating that he "totally loved it". According to Rubio, viewers had "several different" interpretations of the film.

Krissy Cababa described Float as "a powerful story about being a parent and the struggles you go through as a parent with your kids". She also characterized it as "an important story about acceptance and being able to love and celebrate the people in our lives". Cababa said the short "was about celebrating people for who they are and not who you want them to be". She stated that "people are talking about representation" due to Float, "sharing what this means to them and its importance". She mentioned that the short is "a huge deal". Cababa said the short had received "so much support" and a "positive feedback", saying this had been "really overwhelming".

Music
Barney Jones, who composed the music for the previous "SparkShorts" entry Smash and Grab, composed the music for Float. The score was released on February 28, 2020.

Track listing

Release
Float was released on Disney+ on November 12, 2019, alongside fellow "SparkShorts" entries Purl, Smash and Grab, and Kitbull.

Reception
Float has obtained a generally positive critical response, with writers deeming it "touching", "moving", and "spot on". The child on whom the short is centered was characterized as "extremely cute", and as "adorable". Alex Abad-Santos of Vox described the short as "one of the best new things on Disney+". He commented that "facial expressions and body language carry the story" despite the general lack of dialogue, adding that "a small shift in posture or the way a frown sharpens an entire face wields so much emotion". Abad-Santos stated that the short's "core story could be a story about assimilation and growing up as a minority" or "it could be about what [it is] like to feel different from those around you". He said that "Float taps into the human instinct to fiercely protect someone you love, the worry that the world out there [will not] see them the way you do, and the hope that that big scary world will love this person as much as you do"; he stated that while this "sounds like a lot of ground to cover in seven minutes", the short manages to do that very well. Fortune's Ellen McGirt said that Rubio's "own fear that his son would be judged by others is palpable" through this short. Float was described as "a film about acceptance" with "a heartwarming story".

References

External links
 
 

2010s Disney animated short films
2019 computer-animated films
2019 films
American animated short films
Films about father–son relationships
Films about autism
SparkShorts
2010s English-language films